USS Cook Inlet (AVP-36) was a United States Navy Barnegat-class small seaplane tender in commission from 1944 to 1946. She tended seaplanes during World War II in the Pacific and earned one battle star for her service. After the war, she was transferred to the United States Coast Guard, and was in commission as the Coast Guard cutter USCGC Cook Inlet (WAVP-384), later WHEC-384, from 1949 to 1971. She saw service in the Vietnam War during her Coast Guard career, receiving two campaign stars for her operations during the conflict. Transferred to South Vietnam in 1971, she operated as the Republic of Vietnam Navy frigate RVNS Trần Quốc Toản (HQ-06) until South Vietnams collapse in April 1975 at the end of the Vietnam War. She fled to the Philippines and in 1976 was transferred to the Philippine Navy, which never commissioned her, instead using her as a source of spare parts for her sister ships, the s, before discarding her in 1982.

Construction and commissioning

Cook Inlet (AVP-36) was laid down on 23 August 1943 at Lake Washington Shipyard at Houghton, Washington. She was launched on 13 May 1944, sponsored by Mrs. H. K. Stubbs, wife of Captain Stubbs, and commissioned on 5 November 1944.

United States Navy service

World War II 
 
Cook Inlet departed San Diego, California, on 15 January 1945 and arrived at Pearl Harbor, Hawaii, on 21 January 1945. She tended seaplanes at Hilo, Hawaii, from 25 January 1945 to 31 January 1945.

Cook Inlet arrived off Saipan on 26 February 1945 to serve with the escort and patrol group based there, and from 2 March 1945 to 14 March 1945 was on an air-sea rescue station during the invasion of Iwo Jima. Cook Inlet rescued 27 survivors of downed bombers. She was still on duty at Iwo Jima when hostilities with Japan ended on 15 August 1945, bringing World War II to a close.

Honors and awards
Cook Inlet received one battle star for World War II service.

Post-World War II 

Cook Inlet remained on duty off Iwo Jima until 29 November 1945, when she sailed to Jinsen, Korea, for duty as station tender. She then returned to the United States, calling at Iwo Jima and Pearl Harbor before reaching San Francisco, California, on 22 January 1946.

Decommissioning

Cook Inlet was decommissioned and placed in reserve in the Pacific Reserve Fleet on 31 March 1946.

United States Coast Guard service 
Barnegat-class ships were very reliable and seaworthy and had good habitability, and the Coast Guard viewed them as ideal for ocean station duty, in which they would perform weather reporting and search and rescue tasks, once they were modified by having a balloon shelter added aft and having oceanographic equipment, an oceanographic winch, and a hydrographic winch installed. After World War II, the U.S. Navy transferred 18 of the ships to the Coast Guard, in which they were known as the Casco-class cutters.

The Navy loaned Cook Inlet to the Coast Guard on 20 September 1948. After undergoing conversion for Coast Guard use, she was commissioned into the Coast Guard on 15 January 1949 as USCGC Cook Inlet (WAVP-384).

Service history

North Atlantic
Cook Inlets home port was Portland, Maine, throughout her Coast Guard career of almost 23 years. She served in the North Atlantic Ocean, where her primary duty was to serve on ocean stations to gather meteorological data. While on duty in one of these stations, she was required to patrol a 210-square-mile (544-square-kilometer) area for three weeks at a time, leaving the area only when physically relieved by another Coast Guard cutter or in the case of a dire emergency. While on station, she acted as an aircraft check point at the point of no return, a relay point for messages from ships and aircraft, a source of the latest weather information for passing aircraft, as a floating oceanographic laboratory, and as a search-and-rescue ship for downed aircraft and vessels in distress, and she engaged in law enforcement operations.

On 12 October 1953, Cook Inlet rendezvoused with the Coast Guard cutter USCGC Chambers (WDE-491) in the Atlantic to take a medical patient from Chambers which Chambers had evacuated the previous day from the merchant ship Neva West. She then transported that patient to medical facilities ashore.

Cook Inlet took part in the United States Coast Guard Academy cadet cruise of August 1965.

On 28 January 1966, Cook Inlet rescued survivors in of a swamped pleasure craft. Between 3 and 8 February 1966, she escorted the distressed Liberian merchant vessel Arion to Bermuda. On 8 April 1966, she assisted the burning Norwegian passenger-freighter Viking Princess, sending a fire and rescue party aboard Viking Princess to fight her fires; rushing from Guantanamo Bay, Cuba, in a three-hour voyage, the U.S. Navy frigate  also assisted Viking Princess, taking 13 survivors of the ship aboard from the Republic of China merchant ship Chungking Victory and transporting them to Guantanamo Bay.
In 1969, "Cook Inlet" transported Jacques Piccard and other scientific personnel to Portland after their research sub, the "Ben Franklin" surfaced after its month long, 1400 mile journey, drifting in the Gulf stream.

[[File:USCG Cook Inlet Fire Support Vietnam 1971.jpg|thumb|left|alt=USCG Cook Inlet conducts fire support off the coast of Vietnam in 1971.|USCGC Cook Inlets 5-inch (127-mm) 38-caliber gun fires as she conducts a close fire support mission off the coast of South Vietnam in 1971.]]Cook Inlet was reclassified as a high endurance cutter and re-designated WHEC-384 on 1 May 1966. Her loan period from the Navy came to an end on 26 September 1966, when she was transferred permanently from the Navy to the Coast Guard.

On 8 January 1968, Cook Inlet evacuated a crewman in medical distress from the Swedish merchant ship California.

Vietnam War
Cook Inlet was assigned to Coast Guard Squadron Three in South Vietnam on 2 July 1971. Coast Guard Squadron Three was tasked to operate in conjunction with U.S. Navy forces in Operation Market Time, the interdiction of North Vietnamese arms and munitions traffic along the coastline of South Vietnam during the Vietnam War. The squadron's other Vietnam War duties included fire support for ground forces, resupplying Coast Guard and Navy patrol boats, and search-and-rescue operations. Cook Inlet served in this capacity until 21 December 1971.

Honors and awards
Cook Inlet earned two campaign stars for her Vietnam War service, for:

Consolidation I 16 July 1971 – 9 August 1971, 27 August 1971 – 15 September 1971, 1 October 1971 – 24 October 1971, and 22 November 1971 – 30 November 1971
Consolidation II 1 December 1971 – 15 December 1971

Decommissioning
The Coast Guard decommissioned Cook Inlet  in South Vietnam on 21 December 1971, the day her Vietnam War tour ended.

Republic of Vietnam Navy service

On 21 December 1971 – the day the Coast Guard decommissioned her – Cook Inlet was transferred to South Vietnam, which commissioned her into the Republic of Vietnam Navy as the frigate RVNS Trần Quốc Toản (HQ-06)'''. By mid-1972, six other former Casco-class cutters – known in the Republic of Vietnam Navy as the s – also were in South Vietnamese service. They were the largest warships in the South Vietnamese inventory, and their 5-inch (127-millimeter) guns were South Vietnam's largest naval guns. Trần Quốc Toản and her sisters fought alongside U.S. Navy ships during the final years of the Vietnam War, patrolling the South Vietnamese coast and providing gunfire support to South Vietnamese forces ashore.

When South Vietnam collapsed at the end of the Vietnam War in late April 1975, Trần Quốc Toản became a ship without a country. She fled to Subic Bay in the Philippines, packed with South Vietnamese refugees. On 22 and 23 May 1975, a U.S. Coast Guard team inspected Trần Quốc Toản and five of her sister ships, which also had fled to the Philippines in April 1975. One of the inspectors noted: "These vessels brought in several hundred refugees and are generally rat-infested. They are in a filthy, deplorable condition. Below decks generally would compare with a garbage scow."

Philippine Navy
The Republic of the Philippines took custody of Trần Quốc Toản after her arrival in 1975, and the United States formally transferred her to the Philippines on 5 April 1976. She did not enter Philippine Navy service; instead she and her sister ship  were cannibalized for spare parts to allow the Philippines to keep four other sister ships – all former South Vietnamese ships known in the Philippine Navy as the s – in commission in the Philippine Navy.

The former Trần Quốc Toản was discarded in 1982 and probably scrapped.

 References 

 for USS Cook Inlet (AVP-36)
 for USS Wilkinson (DL-5)
NavSource Online: Service Ship Photo Archive USS Cook Inlet (AVP-36) USCGC Cook Inlet (WAVP-384 / WHEC-384)
Department of the Navy: Naval Historical Center: Online Library of Selected Images: U.S. Navy Ships: USS Cook Inlet (AVP-36), 1944-1948
United States Coast Guard Historian's Office: Cook Inlet, 1949 WHEC-384 Radio call sign: NYLW
United States Coast Guard Historian's Office: Mackinac, 1949 WHEC-371
USS Chambers (DE-391) & USCGC Chambers (WDE-491)
United States Coast Guard Historian's Office: Gresham, 1947 AGP-9; AVP-57; WAVP / WHEC / WAGW-387 ex-USS Willoughby Radio call sign: NODB
United States Coast Guard Historian's Office: McCulloch, 1946 WAVP / WHEC-386
 The Inventory of VNNs Battle Ships Part 1 
Chesneau, Roger. Conways All the World's Fighting Ships 1922–1946. New York: Mayflower Books, Inc., 1980. .
Gardiner, Robert. Conway's All the Worlds Fighting Ships 1947-1982, Part I: The Western Powers. Annapolis, Maryland: Naval Institute Press, 1983. .
 Gray, Randal, Ed. Conways All the Worlds Fighting Ships 1947-1982 Part II: The Warsaw Pact and Non-Aligned Nations. Annapolis, Maryland: Naval Institute Press, 1983. .
 Moore, John, Captain, RN, FRGS, Ed. Janes Fighting Ships 1973-1974''. London: Janes Yearbooks, 1973. No ISBN number.

External links
 

Barnegat-class seaplane tenders
Ships transferred from the United States Navy to the Republic of Vietnam Navy
Ships transferred from the United States Navy to the Philippine Navy
1944 ships
World War II seaplane tenders of the United States
Ships transferred from the United States Navy to the United States Coast Guard
Ships of the United States Coast Guard
Casco-class cutters
Vietnam War patrol vessels of the United States
Alaska-related ships
Weather ships
Vietnam War frigates of South Vietnam
Trần Quang Khải-class frigates
Ships built at Lake Washington Shipyard